Girl's Day Everyday #5 is the sixth extended play promoted as (seventh) by South Korean girl group Girl's Day. It was released by Dream Tea Entertainment and distributed by Loen Entertainment on March 27, 2017. "I'll Be Yours" was released as the title track from the EP, and was used to promote on several South Korean music programs, including Music Bank and Inkigayo. A music video for the title track was also released on March 27.

It was the last album the group would release under Dream T Entertainment as the group to go on a indefinite hiatus.

Background and release 
The EP was released on March 27, 2017, at noon KST through several South Korean music portals, including Melon, and iTunes for the global market.

Promotion 
Girl's Day held their first comeback stage on SBS MTV's The Show on March 28, 2017, performing "Love Again" and title track "I'll Be Yours". They continued on MBC Music's Show Champion on March 29, Mnet's M Countdown on March 30, KBS's Music Bank on March 31, MBC's Show! Music Core on April 1 and SBS's Inkigayo on April 2.

Singles
The title track "I'll Be Yours", entered and peaked at number 3 on the Gaon Digital Chart on the chart issue dated March 26 - April 1, 2017. In its second week, the song fell to number 11.

The title track entered at number 76 on the Gaon Digital Chart for the month of March 2017, with 109,375 downloads sold.

Commercial performance 
Girl's Day Everyday #5 entered and peaked at number 5 on the Gaon Album Chart on the chart issue dated March 26 - April 1, 2017. In its second week, the EP fell to number 52 and in its third week, the EP rose to number 27. The EP also entered and peaked at number 7 on Billboard's World Albums for the week ending April 15, 2017.

The EP entered at number 15 on the Gaon Album Chart for the month of March 2017, with 8,104 physical copies sold in five days.

Track listing

Charts

Weekly charts

Monthly charts

Release history

References 

2017 EPs
Girl's Day albums
Kakao M EPs